The chancellor of Austria is the head of government of Austria, appointed by the president and viewed as the country's de facto chief executive. The chancellor chairs and leads the Cabinet, which also includes the vice-chancellor and the ministers.

Following World War I, the office was established by the Provisional National Assembly on 30 October 1918 and named state chancellor of the Republic of German-Austria, and its first holder, Karl Renner, was appointed by the State Council. After the Allied powers denied German-Austria to merge with the  Weimar Republic, the country formed the federal First Austrian Republic and the office was renamed from state chancellor to federal chancellor. The first federal chancellor was Michael Mayr. There have been ten chancellors who served under the First Republic until Chancellor Engelbert Dollfuss created the authoritarian and dictatorial Federal State of Austria. Following Dollfuss's assassination by Austrian National Socialists, Kurt Schuschnigg succeeded him as chancellor and upheld the dictatorship. Schuschnigg was replaced by Arthur Seyss-Inquart, a Nazi caretaker who held the office for two days, until Austria was annexed into Nazi Germany.

Austria under National Socialism lost its original republican system of government and was administered by Reichsstatthalter Arthur Seyss-Inquart (1938–1939), Reich Commissioner Josef Bürckel (1939–1940) and Reichsstatthalter Baldur von Schirach (1940–1945). In 1940, the country was renamed Ostmark, completely lost its autonomy, and became a sub-national division of Nazi Germany. After the liberation of Vienna and the capitulation of Nazi Germany in 1945, Austria restored its republican form of government. However, Austria remained under allied occupation until 1955 and thus the country's sovereignty was ultimately still held by the Allied Control Council.

Since the institution of the republic, the People's Party and the Social Democratic Party have largely dominated Austrian politics; the People's Party (and its predecessor, the Christian Social Party) have led nineteen cabinets and served as a junior partner in eight, while the Social Democratic Party (formerly the Social Democratic Workers' Party) has led eleven and served as a junior partner in five. There have been seven parties that never held the chancellorship but participated in coalition cabinets: the Greater German People's Party in five, the Freedom Party and the Landbund in four, the Fatherland Front in two, and the Greens, the Alliance for the Future and the Communist Party in one.

Following a legislative election or in the case of a vacancy, the president conventionally picks the leader of the largest party in Parliament to serve as chancellor, and appoints the remaining members of the Cabinet based on the chancellor's recommendation. If a sitting chancellor dies, resigns, or is otherwise unable to exercise the powers and duties of the office, the vice-chancellor becomes acting chancellor. If the vice-chancellor is unavailable, the other members of the Cabinet take over in order of seniority.

Bruno Kreisky was the longest-serving chancellor, with more than thirteen years in office, while Arthur Seyss-Inquart was the shortest-serving chancellor, with two days in office, and Walter Breisky was the shortest-serving acting chancellor, with only one day in office.

Chancellors

See also 
 History of Austria
 Politics of Austria
 Elections in Austria
 President of Austria
 List of presidents of Austria
 Vice-Chancellor of Austria
 List of political parties in Austria

Notes

References

External links 
 Official website of the Austrian Chancellery
 List of Chancellors since 1945 on the Chancellery website

 
Austria
Chancellors